Dato Dartsimelia (born 28 January 1995 in Tbilisi) is a Georgian football player.

Club career
He made his professional debut in the Nemzeti Bajnokság I for Nyíregyháza Spartacus FC on 28 February 2015 in a game against Budapest Honvéd FC.

References

External links
 

1995 births
Living people
Footballers from Tbilisi
Association football forwards
Footballers from Georgia (country)
FC Lokomotivi Tbilisi players
Nyíregyháza Spartacus FC players
FC Kolkheti-1913 Poti players
Nemzeti Bajnokság I players
Expatriate footballers from Georgia (country)
Expatriate footballers in Ukraine
Expatriate footballers in Hungary
Expatriate sportspeople from Georgia (country) in Ukraine
Expatriate sportspeople from Georgia (country) in Hungary
Erovnuli Liga players